Nezhegol is a river in Belgorod Oblast in Russia. It is a left tributary of the Seversky Donets. The average discharge is 8.3 m³/sek ( from its mouth).

Five kilometres (3 mi) before its mouth in the Seversky Donets lies the town of Shebekino.

References

Rivers of Belgorod Oblast